Hal Goldstein (aka Hal G, Hal Gold) is an American multiinstrumentalist (keyboards, vocals, guitar, dobro, mandolin, electric bass guitar, harmonica, accordion), and has played or toured with Roy Buchanan, Laura Nyro, Bobby Keys, Ian McLagan, Felix Cavaliere, Jerry Lee Lewis, Martha Reeves, Wilson Pickett, John Sebastian, Ben E. King, Gary U.S. Bonds, Edgar Winter, Ron Wood and Bo Diddley (Live At The Ritz CD and DVD as well as the USA, Europe and Japan Gunslingers tour of 1987 and 1988), and Tommy James (Tommy James Greatest Hits Live! CD and DVD).

As a composer Hal Goldstein is an eight time SESAC TV And Film award winner,

List of SESAC Film And TV Awards
 2007 - Dateline NBC, Maury, Montel
 2008 - Maury, Montel, Teen Kids News 
 2009 - Maury 2010 - Maury 2011 - Dateline NBC, Maury 2012 - Dateline NBC, Maury 2013 - 48 Hours, Maury 2014 - MauryGoldstein has thousands of original tracks published. He continues to have an average of 175 new tracks a year released in a multitude of genres, and used on network, cable, syndicated, Internet and Satellite USA and foreign.

A list of TV shows and networks using his music and productions include, HBO (sports bumpers), Fox (Geraldo, Huckabee, Glenn Beck, Hannity, War Stories, Fox Report, Shepard Smith, Mike And Juliet Morning Show), Ananda Lewis, ID Channel "I Married A Mobster" (theme), The Big Bang Theory, SEAL Team, Ugly Betty, Dr. Oz, Shameless (Showtime), Tom Joyner, 60 Minutes Overtime, Secret Life Of A Soccer Mom, David Letterman Show, CBS Evening News, CBS Morning News, Morning Joe, Cassadee Pope Frame By Frame (CMTV), Star Trek:Tech, the Kevin Costner film Wyatt Earp, Inside Edition, Keyshia Cole, Biography (Robert De Niro and Chevy Chase episodes), The Young And The Restless, Pan Am, On The Case With Paula Zahn, Steve Wilkos, Nate Berkus, NBC College Football, Behind The Music, The Chisme Club, Quiro Mi Baby (TR3S), The Weather Channel, Montel Williams, Watch What Happens (Bravo), Kathy Griffin, Jason Aldean-Wide Open, promos for Seinfeld, The Bachelor, Vice (HBO), Tia & Tamera (Style), I Used To Be Fat (Logo), How Do They Do It (Science Channel), Law And Order, Tommie Copper Infomercial, Parental Discretion (Nick Jr), The Tragic Side Of Comedy, Bayou Billionaires (CMT), Cedar Grove (Hallmark), Christmas She Wrote (opening music Hallmark movie), Big Brooklyn Style (TLC), Home Delivery, Breaking Amish, Bill Cunningham, Wife Swap (Lifetime), The Today Show, Fashion's Night Out, Hollywood Exes (VH1), Underground Poker NYC (Nat Geo), Couples Therapy, Nightmare Next Door (ID Channel), Saved (Animal Planet), Haunted (Animal Planet), Deconstructing My Religion (CBS), NFL Today (CBS), Beverly's Full House, Sanya's Glam & Gold, Shipmates, Maury Povich, Celebrity Expose, Unique Whips (Speed), Jersey Shore, Beavis And Butthead, The Injustice Files (OWN), The District, LA Ink, Dateline NBC, 48 Hours Mystery, A Shot Of Love With Tila Tequila, Double Shot Of Love, That's Amore, Disaster Date, 10 Years Younger, Extreme Cribs (MTV), Made (MTV), Cuff'd (MTV), Catfish, Ice T's Rap School, One Bad Choice, True Life (MTV), PBS ("For Your Home" theme), Access Hollywood, Elimidate, Teen Kids News, Eyewitness Kids News, Current Affair, Judge Hatchett, America's Most Wanted, Late Show With James Corden, Raising The Dead, When Sparks Fly (Hallmark), Street Court.

TV performances in Australia, Belgium, Brazil, Bulgaria, Canada, Columbia, Croatia, Denmark, France, Germany, Hong Kong, Ireland, Italy, Israel, Japan, Mexico, Norway, Romania, Russia, South Africa, Singapore, Spain, Sweden, Turkey and UK.

Music also used in classic TV shows including Ricki Lake, Lifestyles Of The Rich And Famous, Jane Pauley, Sally Jesse Raphael and Life Goes On''.

As of June 2019, his music has been featured on the Uncle Floyd Garage Sale music show Listeners Lounge segment. The show airs every Sunday at 9AM EST on WFDU FM and streamed worldwide.

Goldstein has been a staff composer for Beachstreet Music since 1995 and has also contributed to Freeplay Music, DSM Producers, Indaba Sync, Getty Images, Move Music LLC.

References

Year of birth missing (living people)
Living people
American harmonica players
American male singers
American male composers
21st-century American composers
21st-century American male musicians